Drinčić is a Serbo-Croatian surname. Notable people with the surname include:

Nikola Drinčić (born 1984), Montenegrin footballer
Zdravko Drinčić (born 1972), Montenegrin footballer

Montenegrin surnames
Serbian surnames